Milfay is a small unincorporated community in Creek County, Oklahoma, United States, about five and a half miles east of Stroud. The post office was established December 14, 1911.  The community was named after Charles Mills and Edward Fay, two railroad officials.

In the 2003–2005 HBO fictional television series Carnivàle, Milfay is the home town of Ben Hawkins, the series' protagonist.

Demographics

References

Unincorporated communities in Creek County, Oklahoma
Unincorporated communities in Oklahoma